The Hell of Steel: Best of Manowar is a compilation album by heavy metal band Manowar. It was released in 1994 by Atlantic Records due to contractual obligations and featured 14 tracks from albums released under the Atlantic label (Fighting the World, Kings of Metal and The Triumph of Steel). The band does not consider it an official release.

Track listing

Additional information
 The song "Herz Aus Stahl" is a German version of the Kings of Metal track "Heart of Steel".
 While the tracks are not laid out in chronological order, the album starts off with the first track of Fighting the World and ends with the final track of The Triumph of Steel.

Charts

References

1994 compilation albums
Manowar albums
Atlantic Records compilation albums